Juan Antonio Ortega y Díaz-Ambrona (born 11 December 1939) is a Spanish politician from the Union of the Democratic Centre (UCD) who served as Minister of Education from September 1980 to December 1981.

References

1939 births
Living people
Complutense University of Madrid alumni
Government ministers of Spain
20th-century Spanish politicians
Education ministers of Spain